Ethnosymbolism is a school of thought in the study of nationalism that stresses the importance of symbols, myths, values and traditions in the formation and persistence of the modern nation state.

As a critique of modernist theories of nationalism, ethnosymbolism defends the antiquity and la longue durée of nations while modernists believe nations are a purely modern phenomenon. John A. Armstrong, Anthony D. Smith and John Hutchinson are regarded as important theorists of ethnosymbolism.

The term was first used as "ethno-symbolist approach" in an article by Daniele Conversi, Smith's former student at the London School of Economics. However, Conversi was slightly critical, arguing: "if we focus exclusively on the power of the past and its symbols, we miss two other key features of nationalism: first, its relationship with political power, and particularly with the state; second, its crucial border-generating function".

Important theorists and theories

John A. Armstrong 
Armstrong's contribution to ethnosymbolism is his myth-symbol complexes in Nations before Nationalism published in 1982, which firstly underlined the significance of la longue durée according to Anthony D. Smith. Armstrong believes that ethnic consciousness has existed for long, whose traces could even be found in ancient civilisations such as Egypt, and nationalism is merely "the final stage of a larger cycle of ethnic consciousness reaching back to the earliest forms of collective organization". Therefore, similar to the longue durée of Annales School, formation of ethnic identity should be examined in time dimensions of many centuries.

He emphasised the boundaries for human identity by adopting the social interaction model of Fredrik Barth and argues that "groups tend to define themselves not by reference to their own characteristics but by exclusion, that is, by comparison to 'strangers. In other words, the character of a group is never fixed, and in accordance with group member's individual perceptions the boundaries of identities vary. Hence, comparing to the objective group characteristics, the boundary mechanisms of distinguishing a particular group from others should be studied more.

His conception of ethnic group defined by exclusion rules out any definitional way to distinguish ethnicity from other collective identity including religious and class identities, for which reason himself is more concerned with the shifting interactions among class, ethnic religious loyalties than with "compartmentalizing definitions".

For Armstrong, "myth, symbol, communication and cluster of associated attitudinal factors are usually more persistent than purely material factors", which indicates his emphasis on the persistence of these symbolic boundary mechanisms. He further specified and analysed several factors that ensure such persistence. The first such factor, also the most general one, is ways of life and the experiences associated with them. There are two fundamentally different ways of life: the nomadic and the sedentary. The second factor is religion, exemplified by Christianity and Islam both of which gave birth to different civilisations and the myths/symbols. The third factor is city, whose effect upon ethnic identification 'requires examination of a host of factors ranging from the impact
of town planning to the unifying of centrifugal effects of various legal codes, especially the Lübeck and Magdeburg law. 

The fourth factor is imperial polities' role, whose central question is "how could the intense consciousness of loyalty and identity established through face-to-face contact in the city-state transferred to the larger agglomerations of cities and countryside known as empires"? The Mesopotamian myth of the polity as a reflection of heavenly rule, being called mythomoteur by Armstrong, is exemplified as "myth transference for political purposes" since it was used as vehicle for incorporating city-state loyalties in a larger framework.

The last factor is language. Uniquely, Armstrong concludes that "the significance of language for ethnic identity is highly contingent" in pre-modern era. Its significance relied on political and religious force and allegiances for centuries.

Nonetheless, in his later works, he agrees with most modernists including Benedict Anderson and Eric Hobsbawm that national identity had been an invention, and the only remaining disagreement would be "over the antiquity of some inventions and the repertory of pre-existing group characteristics that inventors were able to draw upon".

Anthony D. Smith 
Although a former student of Ernest Gellner, who is considered to represent modernism, Anthony D. Smith has perspectives of nationalism that differentiate him from his teacher. He is also the last contributor to the "LSE debate" on nationalism (named by Gellner). His central thesis is that "modern state cannot be understood without taking pre-existing ethnic components into account, the lack of which is likely to create a serious impediment to 'nation-building'." Smith has suggested theorists to define key terms such as "nation" and "nationalism" beyond the theoretical limitation of both modernism and primordialism. In his opinion, the problem of modernism is mainly that modernists define nation as "modern nation" with characters of European nations of 18th and 19th centuries, making their definition Eurocentric and partial. Instead, he proposes an ideal-typical definition of the nation: "a named human population sharing an historic territory, common myths and historical memories, a mass, public culture, a common economy and common legal rights and duties for all members".

He also introduces the important term ethnie, a French word meaning "ethnic group", which is used to describe the pre-modern ethnic communities and contains six main attributes:

a collective proper name
a myth of common ancestry
shared historical memories
one or more differentiating elements of common culture
an association with a specific "homeland"
a sense of solidarity for significant sectors of the population.

These six attributes suggest that ethnie is "anything but primordial", for which reason that ethnie is formed and constructed.  Its formation is with two patterns: coalescence and division.  The former unites separate units, while the latter functions conversely.

According to Smith's observation, there are four main mechanisms of ethnic self-renewal:

religious reform, exemplified with the history of Jews.
cultural borrowing, exemplified with encounter between Jewish and Greek cultures
popular participation, exemplified with the socio-religious popular movement of the Mazdakites in 5th-century Sassanid Persia undermining the foundations of the Sassanid state.
myths of ethnic election, the lack of which might be related to the diminishment of ethnic survival of Assyria, Phoenicia and the Philistines.

In order to understand "why and how does the nation emerge?", Smith identifies two types of ethnic community: the lateral (aristocratic) and the vertical (demotic).

In his more recent work, Smith has added the third route of nation formation: immigrant nations that consist of the fragments of other ethnies, such as the United States and Australia.

In their analysis of ethnosymbolism, Özkırımlı and Sofos argue that the focus of ethnosymbolism, as this has been formulated by Smith, is the relationship between modern nations and premodern ethnies.  Nations draw on ethnic symbols, myths, values and  traditions they inherit from earlier ages and which they are associated with particular ethnies. 

According to Smith there are three ways in which the past may influence the national present:

• Through the recurrence of the nation-form. The concept of the nation, Smith tells us, refers to a type of cultural resource and of human association that is potentially available in all periods of human history.

• Through established continuities. Continuity can be found in "collective proper names, language codes and ethnic landscapes, all of which may linger on, even after the community to which they were attached has all but vanished". These components may also provide the framework for the revival of the community in a new form. Smith refers to the Greeks as a good example of this revival through continuity of names, language and landscapes.

• Through appropriation and reinterpretation - exemplified in the tendency of later generations to rediscover, authenticate, and appropriate aspects of what they consider to be ‘their’ ethnic past. 

Özkırımlı and Sofos argue against this unproblematic relationship between nations and ethnies suggesting that ethnosymbolist thinking is marked by ‘retrospective ethnicization’, that is, ethnicizes a complex, contradictory and ambiguous past and packages together disparate cultural and social traditions often unrelated to each other using the notion of ethnie. They argue that the nation is defined by the nationalists who also retrospectively construct the ethnies - "collections/collations of cultural practices established over time or invented, and forged together often arbitrarily, according to the judgement or needs of nation-builders—politicians or romantic folklorists, musicologists, educationalists and so on—most often the product of retrospective legitimation of the very processes that have underpinned nationalist projects".

John Hutchinson 
John Hutchinson was supervised by Smith while undertaking his PhD at the London School of Economics. His primary contribution to ethnosymbolism is the theory of cultural nationalism in the Dynamics of Cultural Nationalism (1987).

He separates nationalism into political nationalism and cultural nationalism, which are different, even competing conceptions of the nation, and "have sharply diverging political strategies".

Political nationalists are essentially cosmopolitan rationalists whose conception of nation "looks forward ultimately to a common humanity transcending cultural differences".  Although the fact that the world has been divided into multiple political communities has forced them to work within existing borders, political nationalists' objectives are to "secure a representative state for their community so that it might participate as an equal in the developing cosmopolitan rationalist civilization". Nationalism in most West European states after 18th century meets the criterion of political nationalism, which is also the nationalism that modernists including Eric Hobsbawm and Benedict Anderson refer to in their works.

On the contrary, cultural nationalists believe that humanity is "infused with a creative force which endows all things with an individuality" similar to nature. They regard the state being accidental since a nation is essentially its distinctive civilisation which is "the product of its unique history, culture and geographical profile". Nations are organic entities and living personalities. In perspectives of cultural nationalists, nation is on the passions implanted by nature and history rather than "mere" consent or law. As the organic entity, conflict, generally between ageing traditionalists and the educated young, is not only inevitable for nation but also indispensable for nation's continuous renovation and regeneration. Such conclusion of features of cultural nationalism is based upon Hutchinson's observation of nationalism of late nineteenth century India and China, respectively represented by  Swami Vivekananda and Liang Qichao. On the other hand, cultural nationalism hardly draws attention from theories of modernism.

Not only has he challenged modernism in his earlier works, he has also engaged postmodernism in his more recent works, especially in Nations as Zones of Conflict (2005).

Further reading 

 Maxwell, A. (2020). Primordialism for Scholars Who Ought to Know Better: Anthony D. Smith’s Critique of Modernization Theory. Nationalities Papers, 48(5), 826-842. doi:10.1017/nps.2019.93

References 

Political science
Ethnic nationalism